Pilot Season is a television miniseries written by Charles Fisher and Sam Seder, directed by Seder, and starring Sarah Silverman. The show followed on from the 1997 film Who's the Caboose?, which was also written by Fisher and Seder with Silverman playing the lead. Pilot Season stars Silverman in her original role as Susan Underman and was broadcast in 2004 on the Trio cable network.

Episodes
 "Hope Springs Eternal"
 "Comeback Kid"
 "And Just for All"
 "Reems of Fun"
 "Cat Fight"
 "Reunited"

References

2004 American television series debuts
2004 American television series endings
2000s American television miniseries